El Wak District is a district in the southwestern Gedo region of Somalia. Its capital is El Wak.

The district has suffered from Marehan-Garre tensions over political control, driven by competition over El Wak town. Even between guri (indigenous) Marehan factions there were tensions in mid-2012 over apportionment of parliamentary seats. 

In 2012, the following political and military discord was underway in the district:
Ongoing conflict between the Somali National Army and Kenya Army/AMISOM against Al Shabaab
Resource conflict between the Garre and the Marehan's Ali Dhere
Conflict over land between the Urmidig and the Reer Yusuf (Marehan), although peace efforts were underway
Disagreements over the distribution of relief aid, between the community, non-governmental organisations, and the former-Transitional Federal Government local administration. Resolution efforts were underway but had not been successful.

References

External links
 Districts of Somalia
 Administrative map of El Wak District

Districts of Somalia

Gedo